Serhiy Fedorovych Yarmolych (born 27 November 1963 in Karelian ASSR) is a Ukrainian football coach and a former player.

References

External links

1963 births
Sportspeople from the Republic of Karelia
Living people
Soviet footballers
Ukrainian footballers
Association football defenders
Ukrainian expatriate footballers
Expatriate footballers in Germany
Expatriate footballers in Russia
Expatriate footballers in Belarus
Expatriate footballers in Finland
Ukrainian Premier League players
Russian Premier League players
FC Zorya Luhansk players
FC Chernomorets Novorossiysk players
FC Chornomorets Odesa players
FC Metalurh Zaporizhzhia players
Hallescher FC players
FSV Wacker 90 Nordhausen players
FC Dynamo Luhansk players
FC Hirnyk Rovenky players
FC Mariupol players
FC Neman Mosty players
Kajaanin Haka players
FC Shakhtar Sverdlovsk players